Advance SA is a political party in South Australia. It was founded in 2017 by John Darley. Darley had been elected to the Legislative Council of South Australia as a member of the Nick Xenophon Group, named as Nick Xenophon Team from 2015. Darley quit that party early in 2017 and founded the Advance SA party later in 2017. It was registered as a party with the Electoral Commission of South Australia on 7 November 2017.

Darley was elected to an eight-year term at the 2014 state election, so was not due for reelection in the 2018 state election. The upper house candidates in 2018 were Peter Humphries and Jenny Low where the party won 0.4% (4,190) of the state primary vote, which was not enough to gain an additional seat in the Legislative Council. Darley failed to be re-elected in the 2022 state election.

Electoral results

References

Centrist parties in Australia
Political parties in Australia
Political parties established in 2017
2017 establishments in Australia
Political schisms